Bang Khen Station is a railway station in Bangkok, serving the SRT Dark Red Line. Although the station is named Bang Khen, it is not located in the present-day Bang Khen district. It is located in Chatuchak district since Chatuchak separated from Bang Khen district in 1989.

History 
Bang Khen opened as a railway station on the Northern and Northeastern Line in the early 1900s. The original station structure was demolished in 1990 during the construction of the failed Hopewell BERTS project. 

The new elevated station opened on 2 August 2021. The ground-level station closed on 19 January 2023 and long-distance trains stopped operating from the station entirely.

References 

Railway stations in Thailand

Railway stations in Bangkok
Chatuchak district